A typewriter ribbon or ink ribbon is an expendable module serving the function of transferring pigment to paper in various devices for impact printing. Such ribbons are part of standard designs for hand- or motor-driven typewriters, teleprinters, stenotype machines, computer-driven printers and many mechanical calculators.

The module consists of a length of a medium, either pigment-impregnated woven ribbon or pigment-coated polymer tape, and a transport mechanism involving two axles. At any given moment, most of the length of the medium is wound as a close-spaced spiral around one axle or the other, tight enough for friction among turns to make it behave mostly like a solid cylinder. Rotation of the axles moves the ribbon or tape after each impact and usually aids in maintaining tension along the roughly straight-line path of the medium between the axles. The module may itself include mechanisms that control the tension in the temporarily unwound portion of the medium.

Some typewriter ribbons have two different coloured pigments (usually black and red) which could be selected if the typewriter had a switch to allow for words or sentences to be written in a different colour when required.

Reversing ribbons
Woven typewriter ribbons were the earlier variant. With them, the pigment is an ink that dries on typing paper but not on the ribbon, and the ribbon is mounted at each end to a flanged reel whose hub engages with one of the axles. Only the axle onto which the ribbon is winding is driven, and the ribbon module is intended to work with an axle-driving mechanism that reverses the direction of rotation when the undriven axle reaches the point where there is no ribbon left wound around it. Thus, the full length of the ribbon shuttles back and forth between reels, and each position along it is struck twice in each cycle of the ribbon's motion (once in the right-to-left phase and once in the left-to-right).

An operator who judges a ribbon's ink supply to be depleted to a point of marginal acceptability typically manually winds the whole ribbon onto the fuller reel, releasing it from the empty one, discarding the ribbon the reel it is wound on, and replaces them with a new ribbon that is purchased already wound on a single compatible reel. Typically the attachment between reel and ribbon involves one grommet  at each end of the ribbon that pierces the ribbon and engages with a hook on the hub of the corresponding reel.

One-time ribbons

The IBM Selectric typewriter required ribbons of polymer tape and made them common. With them, the entire impacted area of the pigment coating adheres to the paper and peels off of the ribbon, producing typed copy with greater uniformity of character shape, reflecting sharper contrast between the unmarked paper and the pigmented characters compared to cloth ribbons. This full-depth shedding of the pigment renders multiple passes over the length of the ribbon unworkable, and the module is discarded after a single pass through its length. 

Deducing what has been typed by inspection of the ribbon is far more practicable and reliable than with a cloth ribbon, so some users ensure destruction of discarded one-time ribbons in order to prevent unintended disclosure.

Typewriters